"Welcome to Wherever You Are" is a song by American rock band Bon Jovi from their ninth studio album, Have a Nice Day (2005). It was released as the album's second worldwide single, following "Have a Nice Day". Speaking about the song on Larry King Live, Jon Bon Jovi said "I thought for sure this was going to be a universal, timeless theme song of unity, diversity. Not a hit, not even close. Swing and a miss". The single reached the top 40 in several European countries, including the United Kingdom, where it peaked at number 19.

Lyrical content
"Welcome to Wherever You Are" is a song of affirmation, about accepting who you are and being comfortable in your own skin. Jon Bon Jovi claims the song is greatly influenced by events during the 2004 Presidential Election. Jon campaigned for John Kerry during that time. The song is also notable for being one of the few Bon Jovi songs lacking a guitar solo.

The song also shares its name with an episode of The West Wings seventh season, in which Jon Bon Jovi appears endorsing the fictional presidential nomination Matt Santos.

Track listingsUK and European CD1 "Welcome to Wherever You Are" (Jeremy Wheatley mix)
 "Last Man Standing" (live at Nokia Theatre in New York City, September 19, 2005)UK CD2 "Welcome to Wherever You Are" (Jeremy Wheatley mix)
 "Someday I'll Be Saturday Night" (live at Nokia Theatre in New York City, September 19, 2005)
 "Wanted Dead or Alive" (live at Nokia Theatre in New York City, September 19, 2005)
 "Wanted Dead or Alive" (video—live at Nokia Theatre in New York City, September 19, 2005)UK DVD single "Welcome to Wherever You Are" (video)
 "Have a Nice Day" (video—live at Nokia Theatre in New York City, September 19, 2005)
 "Who Says You Can't Go Home" (audio—live at Nokia Theatre in New York City, September 19, 2005)
 Photo galleryEuropean CD2'
 "Welcome to Wherever You Are"
 "Have a Nice Day" (live at Nokia Theatre in New York City, September 19, 2005)
 "Someday I'll Be Saturday Night" (live at Nokia Theatre in New York City, September 19, 2005)
 "It's My Life" (live at Nokia Theatre in New York City, September 19, 2005)

Charts

Release history

References

2005 songs
2006 singles
Bon Jovi songs
Island Records singles
Mercury Records singles
Music videos directed by Wayne Isham
Song recordings produced by John Shanks
Songs written by John Shanks
Songs written by Jon Bon Jovi
Songs written by Richie Sambora